Bostock is a village and civil parish in the unitary authority of Cheshire West and Chester and the ceremonial county of Cheshire, England. According to the 2001 census it had a population of 229, reducing slightly to 225 at the 2011 Census. The village is between the towns of Winsford and Northwich.

See also

Listed buildings in Bostock
Bostock Hall

References

External links

Villages in Cheshire
Civil parishes in Cheshire